Achilleas Mamatziolas (born November 12, 1971 in Thessaloniki), is a retired Greek professional basketball player.

Professional career
Mamatziolas started his career from the amateur team Propontida Thessaloniki. In 1989 he signed with PAOK. He played eight years with PAOK and he won the 1990–91 FIBA European Cup Winners' Cup, 1 Greek League (1992), the 1993–94 FIBA Korać Cup, and 1 Greek Cup (1995). His best game in his career was a play-off game against Panathinaikos in 1997. PAOK won the game with 90-85, and Mamatziolas end the game with 29 points and 100% hit. He has 2/2 free throws, 6/6 two-points, and 5/5 three-points. Mamatziolas moved to Iraklis the same year, as an exchange for Lefteris Kakiousis transfer. He also, played with  Iraklio B.C., Gymnastikos S. Larissas B.C. and G.S. Olympia Larissa B.C.

National team career
Mamatziolas played with Greek national basketball team in 1993 Mediterranean Games, and won the fourth place. He also played at FIBA Under-21 World Championship 1993.

References

External links
at esake.gr
at eok.gr

1971 births
Greek men's basketball players
Living people
Gymnastikos S. Larissas B.C. players
Irakleio B.C. players
Iraklis Thessaloniki B.C. players
Olympia Larissa B.C. players
P.A.O.K. BC players
Basketball players from Thessaloniki
Shooting guards